James Cochran (born 4 June 1973), also known as Jimmy C, is an Australian-born English artist best known for his urban narrative paintings and for his drip painting style.

Aerosol Art and early career 

In the late 1980s Cochran contributed to the development of the graffiti scene in Adelaide and went on to coordinate a number of community arts projects aimed at giving aerosol art a broader acceptance in the community and to teach painting techniques to adolescents interested in the art form. In the 1990s he adopted the alias 'Jimmy. C' and become well known for his aerosol art murals and his work in city and regional communities across Australia.

Artistic development 

After completing his arts degree in 1997 and then his Master of Visual Arts at the University of South Australia in 2002, Cochran became known for his urban realist narrative paintings, painted in oil, and often depicting the marginalized human subject in the context of the urban environment. He sometimes used religious or mythological allegories to illustrate the existential or spiritual plight of the contemporary subject in the city.

His two interests in graffiti and oil painting converged in 2004, leading to the development of Cochran's signature aerosol pointillist style; portraits or urban landscapes painted entirely from blobs of spray paint. This technique developed into what he called the "drip paintings" and the "scribble paintings", composed of layers of coloured drips or energetic lines to form cityscapes and portraits. Cochran has been based in London since 2012.

In 2017, Cochran was appointed as one of three Fringe Ambassadors for the Adelaide Fringe.

External links 
 Official Artist website
 Official Artist Instagram website
 The Evening Standard, UK article
 ABC News, Australian article
 CNN article and video
 The Guardian, UK article
 Mahoneys Catalogue with text by Chris Reid
 Paris Art

References

1973 births
Australian contemporary painters
Living people
English emigrants to Australia